Gerry's Restaurant and Bar, formerly Gerry's Grill, is a group of restaurants in the Philippines which has branches in the other countries. Its first branch opened at Tomas Morato in Quezon City on February 14, 1997. Later, four branches opened in the US. In 2010, it started to expand in Singapore and, in 2012, in Qatar. On June 21, 2019, Gerry's Grill had 151 branches internationally. The menu includes grilled seafood, pica-pica and Asian and Filipino dishes.

History

Gerry's Grill was opened by Gerry Apolinario on February 14, 1997, as a bar where people could hang out after work. The restaurant business rapidly expanded.

After opening two branches in the United States, the restaurant chain planned to open an outlet in Singapore. It opened at the Marina Bay in December 2010.

References

External links
Official website

Restaurant chains in the Philippines
Companies based in Quezon City
Restaurants established in 1997
1997 establishments in the Philippines